Ironside or Ironsides may refer to:

Arts and entertainment
 Ironside (1967 TV series), an American television series (1967–1975) starring Raymond Burr
 Ironside (2013 TV series), a remake of the previous series, starring Blair Underwood
 Ironside (Black novel), a 2007 urban fantasy novel by Holly Black
 Ironside (Thompson novel), a 1967 American crime novel by Jim Thompson
 Sir Ironside, the Red Knight of the Red Launds in Thomas Malory's Le Morte d'Arthur
 In Doctor Who, a term used by Professor Edwin Bracewell for his Daleks in Victory of the Daleks

Places in the United States
 Ironsides, Maryland
 Ironsides Island, New York
 Ironside, Oregon, an unincorporated community
 Ironsides, Pennsylvania, a populated area in Schuylkill, Pennsylvania

In the military
 Ironside (cavalry), a cavalry trooper in the army formed by Oliver Cromwell
 Operation Ironside, a military deception in World War II
 An alternative name for the Humber Light Reconnaissance Car, a 1940 British armoured fighting vehicle

People
 Ironside (surname)
 Edmund Ironside (c. 990–1016), Anglo-Saxon king
 Björn Ironside, 9th century Viking chief
 Bjørn Haraldsen Ironside (Bjørn Jærnside; died 1134), Danish prince

Other uses
 Baron Ironside, a title in the Peerage of the United Kingdom
 Ironsides, a West Cornwall Railway steam locomotive
 an Icelandic law-book, see Járnsíða
 Boston Ironside, an elite-level ultimate frisbee club team
 Operation Ironside, one name for the ANOM sting operation

See also

 Edmund Ironside (play), a piece of Shakespeare Apocrypha
 Old Ironsides (disambiguation)
 USS New Ironsides
 
 Iron armour
 Ironclad
 Armor
 Ironhide (disambiguation)
 Iron (disambiguation)
 Side (disambiguation)